El Chompipe Hill Protected Zone, is a protected area in Costa Rica, managed under the Central Pacific Conservation Area, it was created in 1999 by decree 28196-MINAE.

References 

Nature reserves in Costa Rica
Protected areas established in 1999
1999 establishments in Costa Rica